Daniel Klicnik (born 31 May 2003) is an Austrian professional footballer who plays as a defender for 2. Liga club Liefering.

Career
He started his career with FC Zeltweg and went on to FC Judenburg. From 2016 to 2018 he played for the  SK Sturm Graz Academy, and from 2018 till 2021 for the  Red Bull Salzburg Academy. 2021 he was promoted to FC Liefering.

His debut for Liefering in the 2. Liga he gave in October 2021, when he came in for Samuel Major in the 11th round against FC Juniors OÖ.

Career statistics

Club

Notes

References

2003 births
Living people
Austrian footballers
Austria youth international footballers
Association football defenders
2. Liga (Austria) players
SK Sturm Graz players
FC Red Bull Salzburg players
FC Liefering players